= Mohammad Jumah =

Syrian politician

Mohammad Jumah (1925 - 2013) born in Damascus was a Syrian intellectual, former Minister of State, writer and doctor of medicine.

Having completed his medical studies at the Pierre and Marie Curie University in Paris, he came back to Damascus, Syria. He held various positions in the Hafez Al Assad government, mainly in the ministry of health and notably being appointed as the Syrian Minister of State - despite representing the opposition.
